The Caraba Formation (Tcr) is a geologic formation in Panama. The formation was first defined in 1950 by Jones as a facies member of the Caimito Formation. The formation consists of poorly lithified, pebbly, tuffaceous, calcareous sandstones and conglomerates and preserves fossils dating back to the Early Oligocene period.

Fossil content 
The following fossils have been reported from the formation:
Bivalves
 Leopecten gatunensis
 ?Argopecten sp.

Gastropods
 Pachycrommium trinitatensis
 Ficus sp.

See also 

 List of fossiliferous stratigraphic units in Panama

References

Bibliography 
 
 

Geologic formations of Panama
Paleogene Panama
Sandstone formations
Conglomerate formations
Formations
Formations